NCVS can stand for:

The Northern Cities Vowel Shift
The National Crime Victimization Survey
The National Center for Voice and Speech